Drive-through is a service that motorists can use from their vehicle (without parking).

It may also mean:
 the auto-racing penalty: Drive-through (auto racing)
 a 2007 film: Drive-Thru (film)
 a song by Tenacious D: Tenacious D (album)
 a SpongeBob SquarePants episode: SpongeBob SquarePants (season 8)